Archery at the 2000 Summer Olympics was held at Sydney International Archery Park in Sydney, Australia with ranking rounds on 16 September and regular competition held from 17 to 20 September. One hundred twenty-eight archers from forty-six nations competed in the four gold medal events—individual and team events for men and for women—that were contested at these games.

The Korean team won three out of the four gold medals contested. Eight Olympic records and three world records were broken at these games.

Qualification and format
There were four ways for National Olympic Committees (NOCs) to qualify berths for individual archers for the Olympics in archery. No NOC was allowed to enter more than three archers. For each gender, the host nation (Australia) was guaranteed three spots. The 1999 World Target Competition's top 8 teams (besides the host nation) each received three spots, and the 19 highest ranked archers after the team qualifiers were removed also received spots. 15 of the remaining 18 spots were divided equally among the five Olympic continents for allocation in continental tournaments. The last three spots in each gender were determined by the Tripartite Commission.

Each NOC that received three places for individual archers (i.e., the host nation, the top 8 teams at the World Target Competition, and any other nation that was able to take 3 of the remaining 37 places) was able to have its three archers compete as a team in the team competition.

All archery at the 2000 Olympics was done from a range of 70 meters. The target consists of concentric circles, and has a total diameter of 122 cm. An archer had 40 seconds to shoot each arrow. 64 archers in each gender took part in the Olympics, with each National Olympic Committee being able to enter a maximum of three archers. Each archer shot 12 ends, or groups, of 6 arrows per end in the ranking round. The score from that round determined the match-ups in the elimination rounds, with high-ranking archers facing low-ranking archers. There were three rounds of elimination that used six ends of three arrows, narrowing the field of archers to 32, then to 16, then to 8. The three final rounds (quarterfinals, semifinals, and medal matches) each used four ends of three arrows.

Participating nations 

Forty six nations contributed archers to compete in the events.  Below is a list of the competing nations; in parentheses are the number of national competitors.

Medal summary

Medal table

Men's

Women's

See also
 Archery at the 2000 Summer Paralympics

References

External links
International Olympic Committee results database

 
2000
2000 Summer Olympics events
2000 in archery
International archery competitions hosted by Australia